Negatives 2 is Phantom Planet's second collection of rare demos and tracks, released on their official bootleg site in 2004, after initially being released to fanclub members only.

Track listing

Phantom Planet albums
2004 compilation albums
Fan-club-release albums